Statistics of Soviet Top League for the 1980 season.

Overview
It was contested by 18 teams, and Dynamo Kyiv won the championship.

League standings

Results

Top scorers
20 goals
 Sergey Andreyev (SKA Rostov-on-Don)

19 goals
 Oleg Blokhin (Dynamo Kyiv)

17 goals
 Ramaz Shengelia (Dinamo Tbilisi)

14 goals
 Yuriy Horyachev (Chornomorets)
 Aleksandr Tarkhanov (CSKA Moscow)

12 goals
 Vladimir Kazachyonok (Zenit)
 Valeriy Petrakov (Lokomotiv Moscow)

11 goals
 Revaz Chelebadze (Dinamo Tbilisi)

10 goals
 Andranik Khachatryan (Ararat)
 Pyotr Vasilevsky (Dinamo Minsk)

References
Soviet Union - List of final tables (RSSSF)

Soviet Top League seasons
1
Soviet
Soviet